Bursar in Iran may refer to:
 Bursar, Mazandaran
 Bursar, Sistan and Baluchestan